Spring Lawn is a historic home on Kemble Street in Lenox, Massachusetts. Built in 1904 for John Alexandre, the mansion is considered a unique blend of Beaux-Arts and Classical Revival styles. Spring Lawn was designed by Guy Lowell who was also the architect of the Museum of Fine Arts, Boston and the New York Supreme Court courthouse. The property has seen many uses over the years including acting as the home of the National Music Foundation and Shakespeare & Company.  Today, there are plans to convert the mansion and its surrounding property into a luxury resort.

See also
 Berkshire Cottages

External links
 Spring Lawn
 iBerkshires July 14, 2005 'Shakespeare & Company sells part of Lenox Property'

Houses in Berkshire County, Massachusetts
Massachusetts culture
Buildings and structures in Lenox, Massachusetts
Gilded Age